The sixth edition of the World Cup of Masters was held in Klagenfurt and Kapfenberg, Austria. This was the second time Austria had hosted the event. It was the final event held. The nations taking part were hosts Austria, reigning champions Italy, Brazil, Argentina, Netherlands, Germany and for the first time France and Portugal. The event was won by Brazil, winning their fourth title overall.

Group A

Group A was held in Wörtherseestadion, Klagenfurt.

Group B

Group B was held in Franz Fekete Stadium, Kapfenberg.

Semi-finals

Third-place play-off

The pitch failed to pass the referees initial inspection and the match was not played. Attempts to rearrange it were unsuccessful.

Final

Champion

References

World Cup of Masters events
1995
1995 in Brazilian football
1994–95 in Argentine football
1994–95 in German football
1994–95 in Italian football
1994–95 in French football
1994–95 in Austrian football
1994–95 in Dutch football
1994–95 in Portuguese football